Eric Hernán Barrios (born 17 February 1998) is an Argentine professional footballer who plays as a midfielder for Ayacucho FC.

Career
Barrios started out in the academy of Huracán de Rojas in 2004, prior to moving on to the systems of Fundación Leo Messi and River Plate. After a period in the latter's youth academy, having appeared at the Generation Adidas Cup, the midfielder left in January 2019 to join Juventud of Uruguay's Primera División. He made his debut during a loss to Fénix on 16 February, taking the place of Cristian Sención after sixty-seven minutes.

Career statistics
.

References

External links

1998 births
Living people
People from Rojas Partido
Argentine footballers
Association football midfielders
Argentine expatriate footballers
Expatriate footballers in Uruguay
Argentine expatriate sportspeople in Uruguay
Uruguayan Primera División players
Juventud de Las Piedras players
Sportspeople from Buenos Aires Province